Naked & Warm is the fifth studio album by American soul singer-songwriter and producer Bill Withers, released in 1976 by Columbia Records.

Track listing 
All songs written by Bill Withers.

"Close To Me" - 3:55	   	
"Naked & Warm (Heaven! Oh! Heaven!)" - 	5:47
"Where You Are" - 3:54	
"Dreams" - 5:34	
"If I Didn't Mean You Well" - 	3:04
"I'll Be With You" - 3:12
"City of the Angels" - 10:45	
"My Imagination" - 4:52

Personnel 
 Bill Withers – lead vocals, backing vocals (3, 4)
 Benorce Blackmon – guitar (1, 2, 3, 6, 7, 8)
 Geoffrey Leib – guitar (1-8), electric piano (1, 7), acoustic piano (2, 3, 4, 6, 7)
 Clifford Coulter – Moog synthesizer (1, 4, 5)
 Don Freeman – electric piano (1-4, 6, 7), acoustic piano (5), synthesizer (7)
 Youseff Rahman – electric piano (2)
 Larry Nash – electric piano (8)
 Jerry Knight – bass (1, 3-7), backing vocals (2)
 Melvin Dunlap – bass (2)
 Larry Tolbert – drums (1-7)
 Earl "Crusher" Bennett – congas (1, 3-7, cowbell (1, 3-7), slapstick (1, 3-7), tambourine (1, 3-7), vibraslap (1, 3-7)
 Kwasi "Rocki" Dzidzomu – congas (1, 3)
 Dorothy Ashby – harp (2, 7, 8), obbligato vocals (2, 7, 8)
 Lenny Booker – backing vocals (2)
 Lois Booker – backing vocals (2)
 Helen Gonder  – backing vocals (2)
 Marsha Johnson – backing vocals (2)

Production 
 Bill Withers – producer 
 Bob Merritt – engineer
 Phil Jamtaas – assistant engineer 
 Rick Smith – assistant engineer 
 Bernie Grundman – mastering 
 Ken Anderson – design 
 Tom Steele – design 
 Elliot Gilbert – cover photography 
Studios
 Recorded at Record Plant (Los Angeles, California).
 Mastered at A&M Studios (Hollywood, California).

Charts

Singles

References

External links
 Bill Withers-Naked & Warm at Discogs

1976 albums
Bill Withers albums
Columbia Records albums